Against may refer to:

Against (album), 1998 album by Brazilian metal band Sepultura
"Against" (song) the title track song from the Sepultura album
Against (American band), 2006 American thrash band
Against (Australian band), Australian hardcore punk band